Ronald Francis Jepson (born 12 May 1963) is an English former football player and manager who is now Neil Warnock's assistant manager at  club Huddersfield Town.

A striker, he scored 86 goals in 354 league games in an eleven-year professional career. He moved from Nantwich Town to Port Vale in 1989, turning professional at the age of 25. Loaned out to Peterborough United in 1990, he was sold on to Preston North End for £80,000 in February 1991. He transferred to Exeter City a year later, before he moved on to Huddersfield Town in December 1993 for £70,000. He stayed with the "Terriers" for three years, helping the club to win promotion out of the Second Division in 1995. He moved to Bury for £40,000 in 1996, and helped the "Shakers" to the Second Division title in the 1996–97 campaign. He played for Oldham Athletic following a £40,000 move in January 1998, before arriving at his final club Burnley later in the year. He helped Burnley to win promotion out of the Second Division in 1999–2000, before he retired in 2000.

After a spell coaching at Burnley, he was appointed as Gillingham manager in November 2005. He was in charge for two years before tendering his resignation. He then returned to the back-room as a coach at Huddersfield Town, Crystal Palace, Queens Park Rangers, Leeds United, Bury, and Cardiff City. He took charge of Bury in October 2013 following a period as caretaker-manager.

Playing career
A relative latecomer to the professional game at 25, when he transferred from Nantwich Town, Jepson started his league career under John Rudge at Port Vale in March 1989. The reason for this delay was that he had to spend four years fighting manslaughter charges in Belgium for his alleged involvement in the Heysel Stadium disaster; he was finally found Not Guilty when his trial concluded in April 1989.

He appeared just twice for the "Valiants" in 1988–89 as they won promotion out of the Third Division, and was an unused substitute in the play-off Final victory over Bristol Rovers. He then played eight Second Division games in 1989–90, and seeing as he was unable to nail down a first team place at Vale Park he was loaned out to Peterborough United in January 1990 for a three-month spell. He played eighteen Fourth Division games for Mark Lawrenson's "Posh", scoring five goals, as they missed out on the play-offs by just three points. Back in Burslem, he played nineteen matches without scoring in 1990–91, before being sold to Preston North End for £80,000 in February 1991.

Les Chapman's "Lilywhites" finished 17th in the Third Division in 1990–91 and 1991–92. Jepson played 43 matches for the club in league and cup competitions, scoring 12 goals. He signed with Exeter City after Alan Ball paid out a £60,000 fee in July 1992. He helped the "Grecians" to maintain their third tier status in 1992–93; they finished three points ahead of his former club Preston North End, who occupied the final relegation place. They did drop into the basement division in 1993–94, but Jepson left St James Park before this eventuality. He played 67 games for Exeter, scoring 25 goals, including four in one match against Wrexham.

In December 1993, Huddersfield Town manager Neil Warnock paid Exeter £70,000 to secure Jepson's services. He formed a successful strike partnership with Andy Booth at Leeds Road, and scored five goals in 23 games throughout the remainder of the season, including a hat-trick past York City on 22 January. The pair helped the "Terriers" to gain promotion in 1994–95, beating Bristol Rovers 2–1 in the play-off Final at Wembley, with Jepson crossing the ball to Booth for the opening goal of the game. He also scored twice in the final of the 1995 Yorkshire Electricity Cup, as Huddersfield beat Hull City 4–2. Over the course of the season he made 54 appearances, scoring 23 goals, whilst Booth hit 30 goals. For his efforts Jepson was voted the club's Player of the Year. He scored 14 goals in 48 appearances under new manager Brian Horton in 1995–96, after which Booth was sold to Sheffield Wednesday for £2.7 million. "Rocket Ronnie", as Jepson was called by the Huddersfield fans, also left the Galpharm Stadium, having played a total of 125 games for the club in all competitions, scoring 42 goals.

He signed with Bury on a £40,000 transfer in August 1996, as helped Stan Ternent's "Shakers" to top the Second Division table in 1996–97, finishing ahead of Stockport County by a two-point margin; Jepson had scored nine goals in 36 appearances throughout the campaign. However he hit the target just once in the first half of the 1997–98 campaign, and was sold on to Oldham Athletic for £40,000 in January 1998. He featured just nine times at Boundary Park, scoring four goals, before departing at the end of the season after Neil Warnock was replaced by Andy Ritchie.

He signed with Burnley in time for the start of the 1998–99 campaign, rejoining former manager Stan Ternent, and scored once in seventeen appearances for "Clarets". He helped the club to win promotion into the First Division in 1999–2000, scoring twice in 36 appearances, in both encounters with former club Bury, as Burnley finished second in the Second Division. He made fifteen appearances in 2000–01, all as a substitute, before an Achilles problem ended his playing days. He had made 68 appearances for the club over all competitions.

Coaching and management career
Upon retiring as a player, Stan Ternent, who had signed Jepson at both Bury and Burnley, then appointed him to his first coaching role as reserve coach at the "Clarets". In June 2002 he was linked to the vacant management position at Huddersfield Town, though Jepson opted to stay at Turf Moor.

In May 2004, Ternent's contract at Burnley was not renewed by the club and Jepson was let go along with him. In December of the same year, Ternent became manager at Gillingham, and Jepson joined him, again as assistant manager. Although the "Gills" fortunes improved, they narrowly failed to escape relegation from the Championship. Ternent left the club during the summer, but Jepson remained, as assistant to new manager Neale Cooper.

The 2005–06 season did not start well for Gillingham, and following a run of bad results and an FA Cup defeat to non-league Burscough, Cooper resigned and Jepson was appointed manager on 15 November 2005, initially on a caretaker basis, but he signed a two-year contract within the first two months, although this was not made public until several months later. Jepson turned the season around, and the "Gills", having flirted with relegation danger, finally finished in 14th place with 60 points. He was nominated for the League One Manager of the Month award in April, though the award went to Bristol City manager Gary Johnson. During the close season Jepson's assistant Mick Docherty, who had been on a short-term contract, signed a new two-year contract for the role, and Jepson was able to make long term adjustments to the playing squad.

At the end of the 2006–07 season Jepson was once again linked with the newly vacant management position at Huddersfield, despite claiming to be happy at the Priestfield Stadium. Jepson was relieved to keep Gillingham in League One at the end of the season, however following a poor start to the 2007–08 campaign, with five defeats from the first six matches, Jepson resigned as manager.

On 24 April 2008, it was confirmed that Jepson would return to Huddersfield Town. Previously he had been approached to become the manager, though this appointment saw him reunited with Stan Ternent, who was the newly appointed manager at the club, Jepson would once again become his assistant. The next month the pair were joined by Mick Docherty, who joined as first team coach, having previously worked with Jepson and Ternent at Burnley. After just six months at the club, all three men left the club in November 2008 after a difference of opinion with the board of directors.

Jepson spent a year out of football before joining his former manager at Huddersfield, Neil Warnock, then at Crystal Palace, as reserve team coach in July 2009. He spent a year there before moving to Queens Park Rangers to link up with Warnock once again as reserve team coach in July 2010. After Warnock was sacked by the club and appointed manager at Leeds United, Jepson followed him to Elland Road in February 2012, where he remained until Warnock's resignation in April 2013.

He was appointed as Kevin Blackwell's assistant manager at League Two side Bury in June 2013. Blackwell was sacked on 14 October, and Jepson was appointed as caretaker-manager. It was later confirmed that he would remain as manager until at least January. However the club announced David Flitcroft as their new manager on 9 December 2013, and Jepson was released from his contract.

He returned to the game in October 2016, when newly appointed Cardiff City manager Neil Warnock named Jepson as his first team coach. Warnock and his staff, including Jepson, were sacked in November 2019. He and Blackwell rejoined Warnock in his new role at Middlesbrough in June 2020. The trio were removed from their positions in November 2021.

On 13 February 2023, Jepson again followed Warnock as his assistant manager to Huddersfield Town, the club where Jepson had won promotion as a player under Warnock.

Career statistics

Playing statistics
Source:

Managerial statistics

Honours
Individual
Huddersfield Town A.F.C. Player of the Year: 1994–95

Port Vale
Football League Third Division play-off: 1989

Huddersfield Town
Football League Second Division play-off: 1995

Bury
Football League Second Division: 1996–97

Burnley
Football League Second Division second-place promotion: 1999–2000

References

1963 births
Living people
People from Audley, Staffordshire
English footballers
Association football forwards
Nantwich Town F.C. players
Port Vale F.C. players
Peterborough United F.C. players
Preston North End F.C. players
Exeter City F.C. players
Huddersfield Town A.F.C. players
Bury F.C. players
Oldham Athletic A.F.C. players
Burnley F.C. players
English Football League players
English football managers
Gillingham F.C. managers
Bury F.C. managers
English Football League managers
Association football coaches
Burnley F.C. non-playing staff
Huddersfield Town A.F.C. non-playing staff
Queens Park Rangers F.C. non-playing staff
Bury F.C. non-playing staff
Crystal Palace F.C. non-playing staff
Cardiff City F.C. non-playing staff
Middlesbrough F.C. non-playing staff
People acquitted of manslaughter